Inga mendoncaei is a species of legume in the family Fabaceae. The plant is endemic to the Atlantic Forest ecoregion in southeastern Brazil. It is an IUCN Red List endangered species.

References

mendoncaei
Endemic flora of Brazil
Flora of the Atlantic Forest
Endangered plants
Endangered biota of South America
Taxonomy articles created by Polbot